Sandra Patricia Zapata Pórtela (born February 3, 1977 in La Argentina, Huila) is a female Colombian race walker. In 2008, Zapata had won a gold medal in the 20 km at the South American Race Walking Championships in Cuenca, Ecuador, and also, set both a national record and a personal best time of 1:33:22 at the IAAF World Race Walking Cup in Cheboksary, Russia.

Zapata made her official debut for the 2004 Summer Olympics in Athens, where she placed forty-sixth in the women's 20 km race walk, with a time of 1:42:22.

At the 2008 Summer Olympics in Beijing, Zapata competed for the second time in the 20 km race walk. She finished the race in thirty-fourth place by eight seconds ahead of Ecuador's Johana Ordóñez, with a time of 1:36:18.

Achievements

References

External links

NBC 2008 Olympics profile

1977 births
Living people
Colombian female racewalkers
Olympic athletes of Colombia
Athletes (track and field) at the 2004 Summer Olympics
Athletes (track and field) at the 2008 Summer Olympics
People from Huila Department
Central American and Caribbean Games medalists in athletics
20th-century Colombian women
21st-century Colombian women